Saint Pimenius, also known as Pigmenius, Pigmentius, and Pigmène ( – 362) is a saint and martyr venerated in the Catholic Church.

Life 
Pimenius was the tutor of Julian the Apostate, who later became Roman Emperor Julian and tried to revive Rome's traditional state religion. Pimenius ended up coming into conflict with Julian because the former was a Christian. As a result, Julian had Pimenius drowned in the Tiber River in 362 AD. He is buried in the Visigoth Basilica at Idanha-a-Velha, Centro, Portugal. In the Catholic Church, Saint Pimenius is considered a pre-congregation saint, with a memorial on the 24th of March and a feast day on the 2nd of December.

External links 

 Saint Pimenius in Find a Grave

References 

362 deaths
Italian Roman Catholic saints
Christian saints
Christian martyrs
Catholic martyrs
4th-century births